Kulvinder Ghir (born 10 August 1965) is a British actor, comedian and writer. He is best known as one of the cast members in the BBC sketch show Goodness Gracious Me. He is also known for playing Aslam in the 1987 Yorkshire-based film Rita, Sue and Bob Too!, alongside Michelle Holmes, Siobhan Finneran and George Costigan.

Early life
Ghir was born in Nairobi, Kenya, to Indian Punjabi parents of Sikh heritage. Ghir grew up in the Chapeltown suburb of Leeds, England. Ghir first began performing on stage at 13, going on to play comedy clubs between 15 and 17, thereafter enrolling in a London drama school.

Career

Ghir made his first television appearance as a teenager in 1981 on the Yorkshire Television programme The Extraordinary People Show. At the time, he was looking at going into animation, and was one of three teenagers chosen to question Gerry Anderson about his techniques, and for general advice.

His next TV appearance was in 1985, in the recurring role of Davy Malik in the BBC drama Howards' Way. His breakthrough role came in 1987, in the controversial British film Rita, Sue and Bob Too!. Since then, he has worked extensively in film, television and theatre.

He is best known as being one of four regular cast members in the BBC sketch comedy Goodness Gracious Me, in both its radio and TV incarnation. Amongst the many characters Ghir played were "Chunky Lafunga", a sexy Bollywood "hero", the superhero Bhangra Man, and as one half of the "Bhangramuffins" duo (alongside series co-writer Sanjeev Bhaskar).

He is also known for providing the voice of Ajay Bains in Postman Pat.

His play Dusky Warriors premiered at the Theatre Royal, Stratford, London, in 1995.

He also lent his voice to a few animated series aside from Postman Pat, including Chop Socky Chooks and the 2015 reboot of Bob the Builder.

In 2009, he was in the film 31 North 62 East as Tariq.

From September 2009 to May 2011, Ghir was part of the cast of BBC Three comedy series Lunch Monkeys, playing Mohammed Khan, father of Abdullah Afzal's character. The show lasted two series.

In 2013, he appeared as one of the feuding brothers in the UK film, Jadoo. He also appeared in the final episode of British sitcom Big School, as Mr. Rupesh the school bus driver. He also hosted the 2013 Brit Asia TV Music Awards. Since 2013, he has played Cyril in Still Open All Hours.

In 2019, he played the protagonist's father in Blinded by the Light.

Filmography

Film

Television

See also 
 List of British Sikhs

References

External links 

BBC interview

1965 births
Living people
Writers from Nairobi
British male actors of Indian descent
British Sikhs
British people of Indian descent
British male television actors
British male stage actors
British male film actors
British male voice actors
British male musical theatre actors
British male Shakespearean actors
Royal Shakespeare Company members
Kenyan emigrants to the United Kingdom
Punjabi people
20th-century British comedians
21st-century British comedians